Rocío González may refer to:

 Rocío González Navas (born 1953), First Lady of Ecuador
 Rocío González (politician), Peruvian Congresswoman
 Rocío González (athlete), Mexican competitor at events such as the 2000 NACAC Under-25 Championships in Athletics